Dzoncauich is a town and the municipal seat of the Dzoncauich Municipality, Yucatán in Mexico. As of 2010, the town has a population of 2,318.

Demographics

References

Populated places in Yucatán